Hovhannes Avtandilyan (born February 15, 1978, in Yerevan, Armenian SSR) is a male Armenian retired diver. He is a two-time Olympian who competed at the 1996 Summer Olympics and 2000 Summer Olympics in the men's 10 metre platform.

References

External links
Sports-Reference.com

1978 births
Living people
Sportspeople from Yerevan
Armenian male divers
Olympic divers of Armenia
Divers at the 1996 Summer Olympics
Divers at the 2000 Summer Olympics